O'Kelly–Riddick Stadium is a college football stadium in Durham, North Carolina. It is the home field of the North Carolina Central University Eagles. The stadium holds 10,000 people and opened in 1975.

See also
 List of NCAA Division I FCS football stadiums

References

External links
Facilities - O'Kelly–Riddick Stadium Webpage

College football venues
Sports venues in Durham, North Carolina
North Carolina Central Eagles football
1975 establishments in North Carolina
Sports venues completed in 1975
American football venues in North Carolina